712 Boliviana is a C-type asteroid from the asteroid belt, with the type indicating the surface has a low albedo with high carbonaceous content. The spectra of the asteroid displays evidence of aqueous alteration. It is named after Simón Bolívar.

Boliviana was observed by Arecibo radar 2005 Oct 29-Nov 1.

References

External links 
 
 

Background asteroids
Boliviana
Boliviana
C-type asteroids (Tholen)
X-type asteroids (SMASS)
19110319